Tahkuna Nature Reserve is a nature reserve situated on Hiiumaa in western Estonia, in Hiiu County.

Tahkuna nature reserve has been created in order to protect areas of forest which have remained largely unaffected by human activity. The nature reserve also incorporates Estonia's largest single habitat of yew, dune forests and mires. A forest trail for visitors has been constructed in the nature reserve. The fauna is varied and home to several nesting birds, e.g. spotted crake and white-tailed eagle. The flora contains several species of orchids; Corallorhiza trifida and Goodyera repens are common.

References

Nature reserves in Estonia
Hiiumaa Parish
Forests of Estonia
Geography of Hiiu County